Discrimination against gay men, sometimes called gayphobia, is a form of homophobic prejudice, hatred, or bias specifically directed toward gay men, male homosexuality, or men who are perceived to be gay. This discrimination is closely related to femmephobia, which is the dislike of, or hostility toward, individuals who present as feminine, including gay and effeminate men. Discrimination against gay men can result from religion, prejudicial reactions to one's feminine mannerisms, styles of clothing, and even vocal register. Within the LGBT-community, internalized issues around meeting social expectations of masculinity have been found among gay, bisexual, and transgender men.

Discrimination in society
According to the French government, discrimination against gay men "is a form of homophobia that specifically affects men. Although it is primarily aimed at gay and bisexual men, it can also affect heterosexual men who are perceived as homosexual. Gay men may be targets of physical aggression or devalued by stereotypes linked to feminisation and hypersexualisation."

The journalist Pierre Bouvier described anti-gay male sentiment as parallel to lesbophobia. Noting how these two different forms of homophobia operate in Western cultures, he wrote,There is very clearly a difference in mechanisms between gayphobia and lesbophobia, and this translates into different types of aggression. Where the collective imagination over-sexualizes gay men and exerts strong verbal and physical violence against boys and men who are not considered sufficiently masculine or heterosexual; for women, on the other hand, the assertion of their lesbian identity will be further disqualified, minimized, reduced to a fad, or even sexualized as a prelude to heterosexuality.

Queer theory

In French academia, queer theorists have examined the unique ways in which patriarchy attempts to enforce both masculinity and heterosexuality on those with male bodies. The French queer and race theorist Louis-Georges Tin examined discrimination against gay men, and the historical development of the various forms of LGBT-related phobias under the umbrella of homophobia. He writes:

In her 2017 text, The Women's Liberation Movement: Impacts and Outcomes, the German gender historian  noted that within the Western media landscape during the 1970s' Gay Rights Movement, prejudice against gay men attracted more media attention than lesbophobia, largely due to the rhetoric of reactionary conservatives such as Anita Bryant, who suggested that gay men were sexual predators.

Academic studies
In peer-reviewed studies which break down and distinguish homophobia separately between discrimination against gay men and lesbians, researchers have found statistically significant differences between heterosexual men and women in regards to their attitudes toward gay men. While no statistically significant differences were found in men and women in regard to lesbians, heterosexual men do demonstrate statistically significant elevated levels of animosity toward men they perceive as gay.

Linguistics
Scholars have noted most homophobic slurs are specifically directed against gay men. Paul Baker of Lancaster University writes, "Many gay men have been subjected to bouts of name-calling, possibly from a time before they even realized what homosexuality was. The over-lexicalisation of pejorative terms for 'gay man' which exist (for example: faggot, pansy, puff, shirt-lifter, brown-hatter, fairy, batty-boy, queer, etc.) is further testament to their status as 'target.'"

See also

 Compulsory heterosexuality
 Effeminacy
 Gaybashing
 Gay panic defense
 Heterosexism
 Societal attitudes toward homosexuality
 Sodomy laws
 :Category:Violence against gay men
 Violence against LGBT people

References

External links

Male homosexuality
Homophobia
Phobias
Prejudice and discrimination by type
Discrimination against LGBT people 
LGBT and society
Violence against men
Misandry